Olivier Cousi (2 June 1959 – 2 March 2022) was a French lawyer.

Biography
Cousi was born into a family who had lived in Eure-et-Loire and was the son of lawyer Pierre Cousi. He received a baccalauréat from the Lycée Carnot in 1976, graduated from the French Press Institute in 1980, and earned a law degree from Sciences Po in 1983. He became a licensed lawyer in 1985 and joined the international law firm Gide Loyrette Nouel.

Cousi served as secretary of the Conférence des avocats du barreau de Paris in 1988 under the leadership of Philippe Lafarge. He became President of the Alliance des Avocats pour les Droits de l’Homme in July 2015. He took office on 1 January 2020 alongside his Vice-Bâtonnier, . During his campaign, he publicly sought to "restore a political role" to the Paris Bar.

Cousi died following a long illness on 2 March 2022, at the age of 62.

References

1959 births
2022 deaths
20th-century French lawyers
21st-century French lawyers
Lawyers from Paris
Lycée Carnot alumni
Paris 2 Panthéon-Assas University alumni
Sciences Po alumni